LCG may refer to:

Arts and entertainment
The League of Crafty Guitarists, a performance ensemble
Living Card Game, a variant of collectible card game

Businesses and organisations
LCG Entertainment, Inc., the legal name of Telltale Games (2018–present)
Lebanese Communication Group, parent company of Al Manar
Living Church of God, a U.S. church
London Computer Group, now the British Computer Society

Places
A Coruña Airport, Spain (IATA code: LCG)
Lochgelly railway station, Scotland (GBR code: LCG)
Lord's Cricket Ground, a stadium in London, England

Science, technology and mathematics
Landing Craft Gun, a craft adapted to carry guns in amphibious operations
LHC Computing Grid, a computing project for the Large Hadron Collider
Linear congruential generator, in mathematics, a type of pseudorandom number generator algorithm
Liquid Cooling Garment, a component of space suits
London Computer Group, now the British Computer Society